This is a list of South African One-day International cricketers. The list is arranged in the order in which each player won his first ODI cap. Where more than one player won his first ODI cap in the same match, those players are listed alphabetically by surname.

Players
Statistics correct up to 1 February 2023

Notes:
1 Kepler Wessels also played ODI cricket for Australia. Only his records for South Africa are given above.
2 Nicky Boje, Mark Boucher, AB de Villiers, Boeta Dippenaar, Justin Kemp, Justin Ontong, Ashwell Prince, Dale Steyn, Jacques Rudolph, Monde Zondeki, Graeme Smith, Loots Bosman, Albie Morkel, Morne Morkel and Johan Botha also played ODI cricket for the African XI. Only their records for South Africa are given above.
3 Makhaya Ntini also played ODI cricket for the World XI. Only his records for South Africa are given above.
4 Jacques Kallis and Shaun Pollock also played ODI cricket for the African XI and the World XI. Only their records for South Africa are given above.
5 Roelof van der Merwe also played ODI cricket for Netherlands. Only his records for South Africa are given above.
6 David Wiese also played ODI cricket for Namibia. Only his records for South Africa are given above.

See also
One Day International
South Africa national cricket team
List of South Africa national cricket captains
List of South Africa Test cricketers
List of South Africa Twenty20 International cricketers

References

South Africa ODI
ODI cricketers